The Church of the Saviour (also known as the kirkha, from the German word "Kirche" (church)) is a Lutheran church in Baku, Azerbaijan (28 May Street), built with donations by parishioner Adolf Eichler and consecrated on March 14, 1899. It is now a Ministry of Culture and Tourism-owned concert hall. The Gothic-style church features a portal crowned with a decorated pediment. While Azerbaijan's Evangelical community ceased to exist in 1936, the church survived the Stalinist period because of petitions to Joseph Stalin in which the petitioners promised, in return for sparing the church, to pray for him till death. Nevertheless, Pastor Paul Hamburg and seven other members of the local Lutheran community were executed by firing squad on November 1, 1937.

The land parcel of 1400 square sazhens for the church was assigned by the City Duma on January 30, 1885. Local residents asked Eichler to make the church similar to one in Helenendorf, but he instead used his own unique style. The cornerstone-laying ceremony was held on Sunday, March 21, 1896, with the Baku governor Lileyev and the city head Iretsky being present. Emmanuel Nobel, his stepmother and Ludvig Nobel's second wife also attended the ceremony. The church's name was announced at that moment. On June 24, 1898, a thirteen-pud gilded cross was raised atop the church. In early 1899 a bell and an organ were installed. The consecration ceremony gathered over one thousand people. On April 23, 1900, the church housed its first organ concert, where Johann Sebastian Bach's works were performed. On December 1, 1996, the Nobel family remembrance evening was held in the church. In 2001 the church was closed for renovation work.

See also
Caucasus Germans

Notes

Churches completed in 1899
19th-century Lutheran churches
Churches in Baku
Lutheran churches in Azerbaijan
Gothic Revival architecture in Azerbaijan
Adolf Eichler buildings and structures